Robert John Edwards  (born 4 March 1953) is an Australian television drama producer.

His series credits include Bump (Australian TV series) (Stan), Les Norton (ABC), Party Tricks, Puberty Blues, Offspring,   Rush  (Network Ten),  Love My Way, Tangle, Dangerous (Foxtel), The Secret Life of Us (Network Ten, Channel 4 UK), Police Rescue (ABC, BBC), The Surgeon (Network Ten), Fireflies (ABC), Big Sky (Network Ten) and Stringer (ABC).

His mini-series include Australian Gangster, (Channel Seven), Romper Stomper (2017) (Stan), Blue Murder: Killer Cop (Channel Seven), The Beautiful Lie (ABC), Gallipoli, Power Games: The Packer-Murdoch Story, Howzat! Kerry Packer's War (Nine Network), Paper Giants: Birth of Cleo (ABC), Marking Time (ABC), On The Beach (Seven Network, Showtime USA), Do or Die (Network Seven, BSkyB) and Cyclone Tracy (Nine Network).

His telemovies include Beaconsfield (Nine Network), six Cody telemovies (Network Seven), pilots for Police Rescue, The Secret Life of Us, Hard Knox (New Line), Fireflies and the children's telemovie I Own The Racecourse (Network Seven).

In all, John Edwards' productions have won 31 Logie Awards, 30 Australian Film Institute Awards, 11 AACTA Awards, four People's Choice Awards (Australia), eight ASTRA Awards and more than a dozen Australian craft awards. Furthermore, On The Beach is the only Australian production to have received two Golden Globe Award nominations.

Biography

Early life
John Edwards was born in Sydney Australia and has lived most of his life in the beachside suburb of Manly. He attended high school at Balgowlah Boys Campus, which turned out numerous other film and television identities including Academy Award winning cinematographer John Seale, actors Rick Carter and Callan Mulvey, director Ian Barry, writer Tim Pye and comedian Phillip Scott. His spent his final two high school years at The Shore School, before attending Sydney University and Jacksonville State University, Alabama.

He was a History teacher in Sydney's West for three years before making the switch into the film and television industry as a researcher then writer at Film Australia in 1981. He wrote a number of productions including Out of Time, Out of Place, The Bounty Experiment and co-writing the two-part telemovie, The Weekly’s War.

Career
After starting his career researching and writing at Film Australia, Edwards began producing, partnered with Tim Read, with the feature film The Empty Beach, starring Bryan Brown, followed by the telemovie I Own the Racecourse (1985) and the mini-series Cyclone Tracy (1986).

He followed this with the TV series Stringer in 1988 and then, partnering with Sandra Levy at Southern Star, the successful action crime drama Police Rescue from 1991–1996 which won Most Popular Drama at the Logies in 1994 and 1996, a swag of acting Logies, 5 AFI and a number of international awards. He went on to make Big Sky (1997–1999) with Levy but then the two separated. Edwards went on to produce Russell Mulcahy's mini-series On The Beach (2000), starring Armand Assante, Rachel Ward and Bryan Brown, and which won two AFI Awards and two Golden Globe nominations.

Then came the breakthrough series The Secret Life of Us (2001–2005), a 20-somethings drama series produced with Amanda Higgs which won six Logies, and the ABC mini-series Marking Time which won a record seven AFI Awards.

Edwards is perhaps best known for his award-winning drama series Love My Way (2004–2007), developed and produced specifically for pay television with actor Claudia Karvan and written with Jacquelin Perske, which won eight AFI Awards, six Logie Awards, and six ASTRA Awards. Love My Way was a tipping point for Australian TV not only in its bold portrayal of the complexities of contemporary adult life but its pioneering application of the HBO model of creating quality drama specifically for television. It won both the AFI Awards for Best Television Series three years running and the Silver Logie Award for Most Outstanding Drama Series three years running.

2008 saw the first season of the Channel 10 series Rush (produced with Mimi Butler), which eventually went to four seasons, and won the 2010 AFI Award for Best Television Drama Series. 2009 saw the launch of new pay television series Tangle (produced with Imogen Banks) (Showcase) which went to three seasons and the shooting of Spirited (W), the latter again collaborating with Claudia Karvan and Jacquelin Perske.

Edwards has also produced a number of miniseries and telemovies including the Golden Globe nominated miniseries On the Beach (Showtime USA/Seven Network); Marking Time (ABC), winner of a record 7 AFI awards, the NSW Premier's Literary Award, AWGIE Award and others; Do or Die (Seven Network, BskyB); Children of the Dragon (ABC and BBC1); Tracy (Nine Network); six telemovies in the Cody series (Seven Network) and telemovie pilots for Police Rescue, The Secret Life of Us, Hard Knox (the only Australian-initiated pilot to be picked up by a US major studio, New Line), Fireflies and Offspring (also produced with Imogen Banks) (series 1–4). More recently he produced Beaconsfield for the Nine Network and Paper Giants: The Birth of Cleo for the ABC, becoming their highest rating drama for many years.

In 2012, Edwards produced the new AFI Award-winning series Puberty Blues (also produced with Imogen Banks) for Network Ten, and the AFI and Logie Award-winning mini-series Howzat! Kerry Packer's War (produced with Mimi Butler) for the Nine Network. Puberty Blues was the winner of the 2nd AACTA Award for Best Television Drama Series, whilst Howzat! Kerry Packer's War was the recipient of the 2nd AACTA Award for Best Telefeature or Miniseries, the Silver Logie for Most Outstanding Miniseries or Telemovie, and Silver Logie for Most Popular Miniseries or Telemovie.

In 2013, Edwards produced the fourth and fifth series of Offspring, as well as the second series of Puberty Blues (both with Imogen Banks), for Network Ten. He also produced the television mini-series, Power Games: The Packer-Murdoch Story for the Nine Network with Jodi Matterson, which won several acting AACTA and Logie awards.

In 2014, Edwards produced Gallipoli (with Imogen Banks and Robert Connolly), for the Nine Network, as well as the Asher Keddie and Rodger Corser series, Party Tricks (with Imogen Banks), for Network Ten.

In 2015, Edwards produced The Beautiful Lie (with Imogen Banks), for the ABC. And in 2016, John joined forces with Village Roadshow to form ROADSHOW ROUGH DIAMOND, along with his son, former ITV Studios and Endemol executive, Dan Edwards.

In 2017, Edwards produced Romper Stomper (2017) the TV Series (with Dan Edwards) for Stan, which won the Silver Logie for Most Outstanding Miniseries and the AACTA Award for Best Sound in Television.

Edwards was granted an honorary master's degree from the Australian Film Television and Radio School in December 2011, gave the 2015 Hector Crawford Address at the Annual SPAA Conference, and was appointed a member of the Order of Australia in January 2017.

"In Good Company"
A number of important and influential actors, directors and writers are linked with John Edwards. The following list is limited to AFI Awards, Logie and/or AWGIE Awards winners.

Actors:
Lachy Hulme
Claudia Karvan
Ben Mendelsohn
Joel Edgerton
Deborah Mailman
Samuel Johnson
Gary Sweet
Catherine McClements
Kat Stewart
Asher Keddie
Dan Wyllie
Rodger Corser

Directors:
Cherie Nowlan
Jessica Hobbs
Stuart McDonald
Matthew Saville
Kate Dennis
Emma Freeman
Glendyn Ivin
Daina Reid
Geoff Bennett

Writers:
Jacquelin Perske
Judi McCrossin
Christopher Lee
Tony McNamara
Alice Bell
Samantha Winston
David Caesar
Jonathan Gavin
Michael Lucas
Debra Oswald

Partial filmography (as producer)
Bump (2020-)
Les Norton (2019)
Australian Gangster (2018)
Romper Stomper (2017)
Blue Murder: Killer Cop (2017)
The Beautiful Lie (2015)
Gallipoli (2014–2015)
Party Tricks (2014)
Power Games: The Packer-Murdoch Story (2013)
Puberty Blues (2012–2014)
Howzat!: Kerry Packer's War (2012)
Beaconsfield (2011)
Paper Giants: The Birth of Cleo (2011)
Offspring (2010–2014)
Spirited (2010–2011)
Tangle (2009–2012)
Rush (2008–2011)
Out of the Blue (2008)
Love My Way (2004–2007)
Dangerous (2007)
The Alice (2005–2006)
The Surgeon (2005)
Fireflies (2004)
Marking Time (2003)
The Secret Life of Us (2001–2005)
Do Or Die (2001)
On the Beach (2000)
Big Sky (1997–1999)
Cody (6 telemovies, 1994–6)
Police Rescue (1991–1996)
Children of the Dragon (1991)
Wendy Cracked a Walnut (1990)
Stringer (1988)
Cyclone Tracy (1986)
I Own the Racecourse (1986)
The Empty Beach (1985)

Honours and awards
In 2011, Edwards was conferred an Honorary master's degree by the Australian Film Television and Radio School.
In 2015, Edwards gave the Hector Crawford Address at the Annual SPAA Conference. 
In 2017, Edwards was appointed a Member of the Order of Australia for significant service to the broadcast media industry as a television producer, and as a role model and mentor.

Love My Way   
Logie Awards 
2005	Silver Logie for Most Outstanding Actress in a Drama Series	| Claudia Karvan 
2005	Silver Logie for Most Outstanding Drama Series 	
2006	Silver Logie for Most Outstanding Actor in a Drama Series	| Dan Wyllie 
2006	Silver Logie for Most Outstanding Actress in a Drama Series	| Claudia Karvan 
2006	Silver Logie for Most Outstanding Drama Series 	
2007	Silver Logie for Most Outstanding Drama Series 
AFI Awards 
2005	Best Guest or Supporting Actor in Television	| Max Cullen 
2005	Best Television Drama Series 	
2005	Best Direction in Television  	| Jessica Hobbs 
2005	Best Screenplay in Television	| Jacquelin Perske 
2005	Best Lead Actress in Television	| Claudia Karvan 
2006	Best Television Drama Series 	
2007	Best Lead Actress in Television Drama	| Claudia Karvan  
2007	Best Television Drama Series 	
Astra Awards  
2005	Most Outstanding Performance by an Actor - Female	| Claudia Karvan 
2005	Most Outstanding Performance by an Actor – Male	| Dan Wyllie 
2005	Most Outstanding Australian Drama Production 	
2006	Most Outstanding Performance by an Actor – Female	| Asher Keddie 
2006	Most Outstanding Performance by an Actor – Male	| Dan Wyllie 
2007	Most Outstanding Drama Program	
Miscellaneous Awards  
2005	AWGIE Award Best Script in a Television Series	| Louise Fox 
2005	APRA/AGSC Awards Best Music in a Television Series or Serial	| Stephen Rae 
2005	SPAA Awards Best Television Drama 	
2005	Henry Lawson Awards Best Drama 

Marking Time   
AFI Awards 
2004	Best Television Mini-Series or Telefeature 	
2004	Best Direction in Television	| Cherie Nowlan 
2004	Best Screenplay in Television	| John Doyle 
2004	Best Actor in a Leading Role in a TV Drama	| Abe Forsythe 
2004	Best Actress in a Leading Role in a TV Drama	| Bojana Novakovic 
2004	Best Actor in a Supporting Role in TV Drama	| Matt Le Nevez 
2004	Best Actress in a Supporting Role in TV Drama	| Katie Wall 
NSW Premier's Literary Award
2004	Script Writing Award		| John Doyle 
AWGIE Awards 
2004	Mini Series Original	| John Doyle 

The Secret Life of Us   
Logie Awards  
2002	Most Outstanding Drama Series 
2002	Most Outstanding Actress	                                          | Deborah Mailman 
2003	Most Outstanding Drama Series 	
2003	Most Outstanding Actress	                                          | Claudia Karvan 
2004	Most Outstanding Drama Series 	
2004	Most Outstanding Actress	                                          | Deborah Mailman 
AWGIE Awards 
2001	Best Screenplay for Original Telemovie	                                  | Judi Mccrossin & Christopher Lee 
2002	Best Screenplay for Drama Series	                                  | Andrew Kelly 
AFI Awards  
2001	Best Actor in a Leading Role	                                          | Sam Johnson 
2001	Best Actress in a Guest Role	                                          | Catherine McClements 
2002	Best Actor in a Leading Role	                                          | Joel Edgerton 

Do or Die 
AFI Awards 
2001	AFI Open Craft Award in TV Drama – Editing 	                          | Shawn Seet 

On the Beach 
AFI Awards 
2000	AFI Open Craft Award in TV Drama - Set Design	| Sally Shepherd, Roger Ford 
2000	AFI Best Television Mini-Series 
Two Golden Globe Nominations

Police Rescue  
Logie Awards 
1993	Most Popular Actor					                  | Gary Sweet 
1993	Most Outstanding Actor				                          | Gary Sweet 
1994	Most Outstanding Drama 
1994	Most Popular Actor					                  | Gary Sweet 
1994	Most Popular Actress					                  | Sonia Todd 
1996	Most Outstanding Drama 
AFI Awards  
1989	Best Director (Pilot) 					                  | Peter Fisk  
1991	Best Screenplay in a TV Drama 			                          | Peter Schreck 
1991	Best Actress in a Leading Role in TV Drama 	                          | Sonia Todd 
1991	Best Actor in a Leading Role in TV Drama		                  | Gary Sweet 
1992	Best Actor in a Leading Role in TV Drama		                  | Gary Sweet 
1993 	Best Direction in a TV Drama 			                          | Michael Carson 
People's Choice Awards 
1993	Favourite TV Drama or Serial 
1993	Favourite Male Star in TV Drama or Serial		                  | Gary Sweet 
1994	Favourite Australian Movie Star			                          | Gary Sweet 
1994	Favourite Australian Film (Police Rescue – The Movie)
1994	Favourite Male Star in TV Drama 			                  | Gary Sweet
1995	Favourite TV Drama/Serial 
Umbriafiction (Italy)
1992	Best Non-European Drama Serial 	
New York Festivals/Worldmedal 
1995	International TV Programming 

Howzat! Kerry Packer's War 
Logie Awards 
2013	Silver Logie Most Outstanding Miniseries or Telemovie 	
2013	Silver Logie Most Popular Miniseries or Telemovie 
AACTA Awards 
2013	AACTA Award for Best Telefeature or Miniseries	
2013	AACTA Award for Best Guest or Supporting Actress in a Television Drama	  | Mandy McElhinney 
	
Puberty Blues 
Logie Awards 
2013	Silver Logie Most Popular New Female Talent	                          | Brenna Harding 
AACTA Awards 
2013	AACTA Award for Best Television Drama Series (S1)	

Offspring S1, S2, S3 
Logie Awards 
2011	Silver Logie Most Popular Actress	                                  | Asher Keddie 
2012	Silver Logie Most Popular Actress	                                  | Asher Keddie 
2013	Silver Logie Most Popular Actress	                                  | Asher Keddie 
2013	Gold Logie for Most Popular Personality on Television	                  | Asher Keddie 
2014	Silver Logie Most Popular Actress 	                                  | Asher Keddie 
2014	Silver Logie Most Outstanding Actress	                                  | Asher Keddie 
AFI Awards 
2010	AFI Award for Best Guest or Supporting Actress in a Television Drama | Deborah Mailman 
AACTA Awards  	
2014 AACTA Award for Best Supporting Actress in a TV Drama	                  | Kat Stewart 
2014 Best Screenplay in Television                                              | Debra Oswald 

Paper Giants" The Birth of Cleo
Logie Awards 
2012	Silver Logie Most Popular Actress	                                  | Asher Keddie 
2012	Silver Logie Most Outstanding Actor 	                                  | Rob Carlton 
AACTA Awards 
2012	AACTA Award – Switched on Audience Choice Award for Best Performance in a Television Drama	| Asher Keddie 

Tangle S1, S2, S3 
AFI Awards 
2010	AFI Award for Best Lead Actress in a Television Drama	                  | Catherine McClements 
ASTRA Awards 
2013 Most Outstanding Drama 
2011	Most Outstanding Performance by an Actor – Female	                  | Justine Clarke 
2010	Most Outstanding Performance by an Actor – Male	                          | Ben Mendelsohn 
2011	Most Outstanding Performance by an Actor – Female	                  | Catherine McClements 
2013	Most Outstanding Drama 
2013	Most Outstanding Performance by an Actor – Female	                  | Catherine McClements 
2013 	Most Outstanding Performance by an Actor – Male	                          | Lincoln Younes 

Rush S1, S2, S3, S4 
AFI Awards 
2010	AFI Award for Best Television Drama Series 
	
Spirited S1, S2 
ASTRA Awards 
2011	Most Outstanding Performance by an Actor -  Male	| Matt King 
2011	Most Outstanding Drama 

Power Games: The Packer-Murdoch Story
AACTA Awards 
2014	Best Direction in a Television Drama or Comedy	| Geoff Bennett 
2014	Best Lead Actor in a Television Drama	| Lachy Hulme 
2014	Best Guest or Supporting Actor in a Television Drama	| Luke Ford 

The Beautiful Lie 
AACTA Award 
2016 Best Guest or Supporting Actress in a Television Drama | Celia Pacquola 
Screen Music Awards 
2016 Best Music for a Mini-Series or Telemovie | Alan John 

Romper Stomper 
Logie Awards 
2018	Silver Logie Outstanding Miniseries or Telemovie	                                   
2018	Silver Logie Outstanding Supporting Actress	                                  | Jacqueline McKenzie 
AACTA Award 
2018	Best Sound in Television

References

External links
 ROADSHOW ROUGH DIAMOND

1953 births
Living people
Australian television producers
People from Sydney
People educated at Sydney Church of England Grammar School
University of Sydney alumni
Jacksonville State University alumni
Members of the Order of Australia